Rick Strom may refer to:
Rick Strom (music producer), American music producer
Rick Strom (American football) (born 1965), American football quarterback